Bolesław Cichecki (23 April 1905 – 1 October 1972) was a Polish footballer. He played in one match for the Poland national football team in 1926.

References

External links
 

1905 births
1972 deaths
Polish footballers
Poland international footballers
Place of birth missing
Association football midfielders
ŁKS Łódź players
Legia Warsaw players